Austria competed at the 1988 Winter Olympics in Calgary, Alberta, Canada.

Competitors
The following is the list of number of competitors in the Games.

Medalists

Alpine skiing

Men

Men's combined

Women

Women's combined

Biathlon

Men

Men's 4 x 7.5 km relay

 1 A penalty loop of 150 metres had to be skied per missed target.
 2 One minute added per missed target.

Bobsleigh

Cross-country skiing

Men

 C = Classical style, F = Freestyle

Men's 4 × 10 km relay

Women

 C = Classical style, F = Freestyle

Figure skating

Ice Dancing

Ice hockey

Group B
Top three teams (shaded ones) entered the medal round.

 USA 10-6 Austria
 Soviet Union 8-1 Austria
 Austria 1-3 West Germany
 Austria 4-0 Czechoslovakia
 Austria 4-4 Norway

Game for 9th place

|}

Team Roster
Rudolf König
Herbert Pök 
Konrad Dorn 
Bernard Hutz 
Martin Platzer 
Thomas Cijan 
Kelvin Greenbank 
Kurt Haranda 
Edward Lebler 
Peter Raffl 
Brian Stankiewicz 
Michael Shea 
Werner Kerth 
Manfred Mühr 
Gerhard Puschnik 
Andreas Salat 
Robin Sadler 
Hans Sulzer 
Gert Kompajn
Peter Zhenalik 
Günter Koren 
Silvester Szybisti

Luge

Men

(Men's) Doubles

Women

Nordic combined 

Men's individual

Events:
 normal hill ski jumping 
 15 km cross-country skiing 

Men's Team

Three participants per team.

Events:
 normal hill ski jumping 
 10 km cross-country skiing

Ski jumping 

Men's team large hill

 1 Four teams members performed two jumps each. The best three were counted.

Speed skating

Men

Women

References

Official Olympic Reports
International Olympic Committee results database
 Olympic Winter Games 1988, full results by sports-reference.com

Nations at the 1988 Winter Olympics
1988
Winter Olympics